Shady Grove is an acoustic album by Jerry Garcia and David Grisman. It was released on the Acoustic Disc record label in 1996. The album was produced by Garcia and Grisman for Dawg Productions. Also appearing on the album: Joe Craven, Jim Kerwin, Matt Eakle, Bryan Bowers, and Will Scarlett. "Hesitation Blues" is an uncredited track appearing at the end of the album.

Chart positions

Musicians
 Jerry Garcia – acoustic guitar, five string banjo, vocals
 David Grisman – mandolin, five string banjo
 Joe Craven – drums
 Jim Kerwin – bass
 Bryan Bowers – autoharp
 Will Scarlett – mouth harp
 Matt Eakle – flute

References

Jerry Garcia albums
1996 albums
David Grisman albums
Acoustic Disc albums
Collaborative albums